Cialente is an Italian surname. Notable people with the surname include:

Fausta Cialente (1898–1994), Italian writer and journalist
Massimo Cialente (born 1952), Italian politician and doctor
Renato Cialente (1897–1943), Italian actor

Italian-language surnames